Iapetus is a moon of Saturn. It is the 24th of Saturn’s 83 known moons. With an estimated diameter of 1,469 km, it is the third-largest moon of Saturn and the eleventh-largest in the Solar System. Named after the Titan Iapetus, the moon was discovered in 1671 by Giovanni Domenico Cassini.

A relatively low-density body made up mostly of ice, Iapetus is home to several distinctive and unusual features, such as a striking difference in coloration between its leading hemisphere, which is dark, and its trailing hemisphere, which is bright, as well as a massive equatorial ridge running three-quarters of the way around the moon.

History

Discovery 

Iapetus was discovered by Giovanni Domenico Cassini, an Italian-born French astronomer, in October 1671. He had discovered it on the western side of Saturn and tried viewing it on the eastern side some months later, but was unsuccessful. This was also the case the following year, when he was again able to observe it on the western side, but not the eastern side. Cassini finally observed Iapetus on the eastern side in 1705 with the help of an improved telescope, finding it two magnitudes dimmer on that side.

Cassini correctly surmised that Iapetus has a bright hemisphere and a dark hemisphere, and that it is tidally locked, always keeping the same face towards Saturn. This means that the bright hemisphere is visible from Earth when Iapetus is on the western side of Saturn, and that the dark hemisphere is visible when Iapetus is on the eastern side.

Etymology 
Iapetus is named after the Titan Iapetus from Greek mythology. The name was suggested by John Herschel (son of William Herschel, discoverer of Mimas and Enceladus) in his 1847 publication Results of Astronomical Observations made at the Cape of Good Hope, in which he advocated naming the moons of Saturn after the Titans, brothers and sisters of the Titan Cronus (whom the Romans equated with their god Saturn).

The name has a largely obsolete variant, Japetus ,
with an adjectival form Japetian.

When first discovered, Iapetus was among four Saturnian moons labelled the Sidera Lodoicea by their discoverer Giovanni Cassini after King Louis XIV (the other three were Tethys, Dione and Rhea). However, astronomers fell into the habit of referring to them using Roman numerals, with Iapetus being Saturn V. Once Mimas and Enceladus were discovered in 1789, the numbering scheme was extended and Iapetus became Saturn VII. With the discovery of Hyperion in 1848, Iapetus became Saturn VIII, which is still its Roman numerical designation today. Geological features on Iapetus are generally named after characters and places from the French epic poem The Song of Roland.

Orbit 

The orbit of Iapetus is somewhat unusual. Although it is Saturn's third-largest moon, it orbits much farther from Saturn than the next closest major moon, Titan. It has also the most inclined orbital plane of the regular satellites; only the irregular outer satellites like Phoebe have more inclined orbits. Because of this distant, inclined orbit, Iapetus is the only large moon from which the rings of Saturn would be clearly visible; from the other inner moons, the rings would be edge-on and difficult to see. The cause of this highly inclined orbit is unknown; however, the moon is not likely to have been captured. One suggestion for the cause of Iapetus' orbital inclination is an encounter between Saturn and another planet.

Formation
The moons of Saturn are typically thought to have formed through co-accretion, a similar process to that believed to have formed the planets in the Solar System. As the young gas giants formed, they were surrounded by discs of material that gradually coalesced into moons. However, a proposed model on the formation of Titan suggests that Titan was instead formed in a series of giant impacts between pre-existing moons. Iapetus and Rhea are thought to have formed from part of the debris of these collisions. More-recent studies, however, suggest that all of Saturn's moons inward of Titan are no more than 100 million years old; thus, Iapetus is unlikely to have formed in the same series of collisions as Rhea and all the other moons inward of Titan, and—along with Titan—may be a primordial satellite.

Physical characteristics 

The low density of Iapetus indicates that it is mostly composed of ice, with only a small (~20%) amount of rocky materials.

Unlike most of the large moons, its overall shape is neither spherical nor ellipsoid, but has a bulging waistline and squashed poles. Its unique equatorial ridge (see below) is so high that it visibly distorts Iapetus's shape even when viewed from a distance. These features often lead it to be characterized as walnut-shaped.

Iapetus is known to support long-runout landslides or sturzstroms, possibly supported by ice sliding.

Two-tone coloration 

The difference in colouring between the two Iapetian hemispheres is striking. The leading hemisphere and sides are dark (albedo 0.03–0.05) with a slight reddish-brown coloring, while most of the trailing hemisphere and poles are bright (albedo 0.5–0.6, almost as bright as Europa). Thus, the apparent magnitude of the trailing hemisphere is around 10.2, whereas that of the leading hemisphere is around 11.9—beyond the capacity of the best telescopes in the 17th century. The dark region is named Cassini Regio, and the bright region is divided into Roncevaux Terra north of the equator, and Saragossa Terra south of it. The original dark material is believed to have come from outside Iapetus, but now it consists principally of lag from the sublimation (evaporation) of ice from the warmer areas of the moon's surface, further darkened by exposure to sunlight. It contains organic compounds similar to the substances found in primitive meteorites or on the surfaces of comets; Earth-based observations have shown it to be carbonaceous, and it probably includes cyano-compounds such as frozen hydrogen cyanide polymers.

Images from the Cassini orbiter, which passed within , show that both Cassini Regio and the Terra's are heavily cratered. There is dark material filling in low-lying regions, and light material on the weakly illuminated pole-facing slopes of craters, but no shades of grey. The dark material is a very thin layer, only a few tens of centimeters (approx. one foot) thick at least in some areas, according to Cassini radar imaging and the fact that very small meteor impacts have punched through to the ice underneath.

The difference in temperature means that ice preferentially sublimates from Cassini Regio, and deposits in the bright areas and especially at the even colder poles. Over geologic time scales, this would further darken Cassini Regio and brighten the rest of Iapetus, creating a positive feedback thermal runaway process of ever greater contrast in albedo, ending with all exposed ice being lost from Cassini Regio. This model explains the distribution of light and dark areas, the absence of shades of grey, and the thinness of the dark material covering Cassini Regio. The redistribution of ice is facilitated by Iapetus's weak gravity, which means that at ambient temperatures a water molecule can migrate from one hemisphere to the other in just a few hops.

However, a separate process of color segregation would be required to get the thermal feedback started. The initial dark material is thought to have been debris blasted by meteors off small outer moons in retrograde orbits and swept up by the leading hemisphere of Iapetus. The core of this model is some 30 years old, and was revived by the September 2007 flyby.

Light debris outside of Iapetus's orbit, either knocked free from the surface of a moon by micrometeoroid impacts or created in a collision, would spiral in as its orbit decays. It would have been darkened by exposure to sunlight. A portion of any such material that crossed Iapetus's orbit would have been swept up by its leading hemisphere, coating it; once this process created a modest contrast in albedo, and so a contrast in temperature, the thermal feedback described above would have come into play and exaggerated the contrast. In support of the hypothesis, simple numerical models of the exogenic deposition and thermal water redistribution processes can closely predict the two-toned appearance of Iapetus. A subtle color dichotomy between Iapetus's leading and trailing hemispheres, with the former being more reddish, can in fact be observed in comparisons between both bright and dark areas of the two hemispheres. In contrast to the elliptical shape of Cassini Regio, the color contrast closely follows the hemisphere boundaries; the gradation between the differently colored regions is gradual, on a scale of hundreds of kilometers. The next moon inward from Iapetus, chaotically rotating Hyperion, also has an unusual reddish color.

The largest reservoir of such infalling material is Phoebe, the largest of the outer moons. Although Phoebe's composition is closer to that of the bright hemisphere of Iapetus than the dark one, dust from Phoebe would only be needed to establish a contrast in albedo, and presumably would have been largely obscured by later sublimation. The discovery of a tenuous disk of material in the plane of and just inside Phoebe's orbit was announced on 6 October 2009, supporting the model. The disk extends from 128 to 207 times the radius of Saturn, while Phoebe orbits at an average distance of 215 Saturn radii. It was detected with the Spitzer Space Telescope.

Overall shape 
However, these measurements may be inaccurate on the kilometer scale as Iapetus's entire surface has not yet been imaged in high enough resolution. The observed oblateness would be consistent with hydrostatic equilibrium if Iapetus had a rotational period of approximately 16 hours, but it does not; its current rotation period is 79 days. A possible explanation for this is that the shape of Iapetus was frozen by formation of a thick crust shortly after its formation, while its rotation continued to slow afterwards due to tidal dissipation, until it became tidally locked.

Equatorial ridge 

It was discovered when the Cassini spacecraft imaged Iapetus on December 31, 2004. Within the bright regions there is no ridge, but there are a series of isolated  peaks along the equator. The ridge system is heavily cratered, indicating that it is ancient. The prominent equatorial bulge gives Iapetus a walnut-like appearance.

It is not clear how the ridge formed. One difficulty is to explain why it follows the equator almost perfectly. There are at least numerous current hypotheses, but none of them explains why the ridge is confined to Cassini Regio. Theories include that the ridge is a remnant of Iapetus' oblate shape during its early life, that it was created by the collapse of a ring system, that it was formed by icy material welling from Iapetus' interior, or that it is a result of convective overturn.

Exploration 
Iapetus has been imaged multiple times from moderate distances by the Cassini orbiter. However, its great distance from Saturn makes close observation difficult.

In popular culture 
The monolith featured during the climax of Arthur C. Clarke's 1968 novel 2001: A Space Odyssey is located on Iapetus.

A team of scientists explore Iapetus in The Saturn Game, a science-fiction novella by Poul Anderson (1981).

Iapetus is also the setting for Czech writer Julie Nováková's story "The Long Iapetan Night", published in the November 2020 edition of Asimov's Science Fiction Magazine.

See also 
 Former classification of planets
 Iapetus in fiction
 List of tallest mountains in the Solar System
 Lists of astronomical objects
 Subsatellite

Notes

References

External links 

 Cassini mission page – Iapetus
 Discussion of Iapetus dated October 2007
 Iapetus Profile at NASA's Solar System Exploration site
 The Planetary Society: Iapetus
 Google Iapetus 3D, interactive map of the moon
 
 Mirror Objects in the Solar System?—refereed article discussing the speculative mirror matter, and Iapetus in this context
 A Moon with a View—Richard C. Hoagland's imaginative discussion of Iapetus's oddities
 New attempts to crack Saturn's 'walnut' moon—equatorial ridge formation theories
 Cassini images of Iapetus 
 Images of Iapetus at JPL's Planetary Photojournal
 Movie of Iapetus's rotation at the National Oceanic and Atmospheric Administration site
 Iapetus basemap (May 2008) from Cassini images 
 Iapetus atlas (October 2008) from Cassini images
 Iapetus nomenclature and Iapetus map with feature names from the USGS planetary nomenclature page
 Flight over Iapetus (video)

 
16711025
Discoveries by Giovanni Domenico Cassini
Moons with a prograde orbit